Yaquq was a Palestinian Arab village, which was depopulated during the 1947–1948 Civil War in Mandatory Palestine on May 1, 1948. It was located 12.5 km north of Tiberias and was built at the site of the ancient Jewish village Huqoq.

History
The site shows signs of early Canaanite settlement, and held by scholars to be the biblical Huqoq, known in Roman times as Hucuca. The earliest mention of the name Yaquq is in the text Signs of the Tomb Inscription by Rabbi Jacob, emissary of the Yeshiva of Rabbi Jehiel of Paris (before 1257 CE).

Ottoman era
In the 1596 tax records, Yaquq was a part of the Ottoman nahiya ("subdistrict") of Jira, part of Safad Sanjak. It had a population of 70 households and 2 bachelors, an estimated 396 persons, all Muslims. The villagers paid a fixed tax rate of 25% on a number of crops and produce, including wheat, barley and olives, goats,  beehives, and a press which was either used for processing grapes or olives; a total of 5,186 akçe. 1/24 of the revenue went to a waqf.

In 1838, Yaquq was noted as a Muslim village in the Esh-Shagur district, located between Safad, Acca and Tiberias.

In 1875 Victor Guérin described the village as having about 20 stone houses. In 1881,  the PEF's Survey of Western Palestine described it as having about 200 Muslim inhabitants, surrounded by arable land. There were many cisterns in the area, and there was a "good spring" there.

A population list from about 1887 showed that Yaquq had 105 inhabitants; all Muslim.

British Mandate era
In the 1922 census of Palestine, conducted by the British Mandate authorities,  Yaquq wa Mawasi had a population of 294; all Muslims, decreasing in the 1931 census  to 153; still all Muslims, in a total of 28 houses.

In the  1945 statistics it had a population of 210 Muslims,  and the total land area was 8,507 dunams. Of this, 1,010 dunams were used for cereals,  24 dunams irrigated or used for orchards, while 13 dunams were built-up (urban) area.

A kibbutz using the old Biblical name of Hukok was established near the site on 11 July 1945.

1948, aftermath
Following its depopulation in May 1948, the village was used as a training site for the Israeli army until it was bulldozed in 1968. Khalidi described the place in 1992: Stone rubble covers the entire site. There is one palm tree in the center and an olive grove on the edge. Part of the surrounding land is cultivated by Israelis, while the remainder is used as a grazing area. A canal that passes to the west is part of the Israeli National Water Carrier, the water project that carries water from Lake Tiberias to the central coastal plains.

References

Bibliography

 

Magness, J.:  “Samson in the Synagogue,” Biblical Archaeology Review 39.1 (2013), pp. 32–39, 66–67.
Magness, J.: October 2013, Scholar’s Update: New Mosaics from the Huqoq Synagogue,   BAS LIBRARY

External links
Welcome To Yaquq
Yaquq, Zochrot
Survey of Western Palestine, Map 6:  IAA, Wikimedia commons
Yaquq at Khalil Sakakini Cultural Center

Arab villages depopulated during the 1948 Arab–Israeli War
District of Tiberias